The Auburn–LSU football rivalry, also known as the Tiger Bowl, is an American college football rivalry between the Auburn Tigers and the LSU Tigers. Both universities have been members of the Southeastern Conference (SEC) since December 1932, but the rivalry dates back to 1901. Auburn and LSU have played every year since the SEC instituted divisional play in 1992. The LSU and Auburn football teams have met 57 times, with LSU holding the all-time lead 32-24-1. This annual matchup is known for wild endings, unusual events, and strong hostility. This rivalry game has been the source of several legendary SEC football games. Including "The Earthquake Game" and "The Barn Burner". CBS college football host Brad Nessler has described the Tiger Bowl as "Where anything can happen".

Notable games

1902 
LSU beat Auburn in a hard-fought game 5–0. Captain Henry Landry scored the game's only touchdown. "Nearly every business house in Baton Rouge closed at noon and everybody went to the game". The trip to Louisiana made some Auburn players sick.

1908
In 1908, both teams were undefeated and competing for the top spot in the SIAA. LSU beat  Auburn 10–2, but both teams may claim SIAA championships, for LSU was charged with professionalism and for some stripped of the title. It was the only game of the season in which LSU did not win by more than 20 points. “We won every game that fall except LSU,” Auburn star Walker Reynolds told Clyde Bolton in 1973. “But LSU had a pro team.”

The first touchdown came from LSU's John Seip. Later, Auburn's T. C. Locke blocked a punt, recovered by LSU quarterback and Hall of Famer Doc Fenton in the endzone for an Auburn safety. According to one source, Fenton was knocked unconscious by a spectator's cane as he tried to get out of the end zone.  LSU made the second score using conventional football. LSU would finish the season with an undefeated record, but did not claim the national title.

1988 - "The Earthquake Game" 
In 1988, #4 Auburn traveled to Tiger Stadium with national title aspirations. Auburn (4-0) entered the game outscoring its opponents 161–44, but were held to just two field goals. Auburn's outstanding defense kept LSU scoreless through 58 minutes. However, with 1:47 left, QB Tommy Hodson found RB Eddie Fuller open on a crossing pattern for a touchdown on fourth and goal. Ironically, it was the same play Fuller had caught on 1st and goal, only to step out of the back of the end zone. The crowd eruption was so intense that it registered as an earthquake on the seismograph located in LSU’s Howe-Russell Geoscience Complex, though much of the lore surrounding the game is largely apocryphal. Both Hodson and Fuller later said it was the most physical game of their college careers. College Football News ranks this game as the 17th best finish in the history of college football. Auburn would have likely played Notre Dame for the National Championship had they beaten LSU, as Auburn finished the season with six consecutive wins, giving up only 31 points in the process. Auburn and LSU shared the SEC crown though Auburn went to the Sugar Bowl.

1994 - Five 4th Quarter Interceptions
Auburn was on a 14-game winning streak when LSU traveled to Auburn in 1994, but it was LSU who led 23–9 entering the fourth quarter. LSU quarterback Jamie Howard threw five fourth quarter interceptions - three were returned for touchdowns - as Auburn extended their winning streak to 15 games with a 30–26 win. Auburn made one first down in the second half, yet scored 27 points in the comeback. Multiple players were hospitalized for dehydration after the game. After the loss, LSU QB Jamie Howard received multiple threats.

1996 - "The Barn Burner" 
LSU defeated Auburn 19–15 in 1996 while the old Auburn Sports Arena, affectionately called "the Barn", burned to the ground across the street from Jordan–Hare Stadium. After scoring a touchdown, Auburn trailed 17–15 and attempted the two-point conversion for the tie. However, LSU intercepted the pass and returned it for a defensive two-point conversion and a 19–15 win. The cause of the fire was officially undetermined, though according to investigators the most probable cause was a grill placed too close to the building by tailgaters, possibly to take cover from heavy rainfall. The fire was shown during ESPN's national broadcast, flames being seen as high as the Jordan-Hare east upper-deck. The game was never delayed, and the Auburn public address announcer continually advised fans: "The flames [were] outside the stadium." Because of the fire and the thrilling finish, the game became known as the "Barn Burner" or "The Night The Barn Burned".

1999 - Victory Cigars
On coach Tommy Tuberville's birthday, Auburn blew out LSU 41–7 during a rare day game in Baton Rouge. In celebration, Auburn players and coaches smoked cigars on the field at Tiger Stadium, much to the chagrin of LSU players and fans. The intensity of the rivalry grew with this game, and cigars are still seen stands during this matchup. This would be Auburn's last victory in Tiger Stadium until 2021, and the cigars were often referenced as bad luck in causing Auburn's 20 year drought in Tiger Stadium.  Years later, Auburn head coach, Tommy Tuberville commented on his teams victory cigars in 1999 that preceded the losing streak in tiger Stadium. “I guess you could call it ‘The curse of the cigar,’” said Tuberville.

2001 - Revenge Cigars
The 2001 matchup was originally scheduled for Sept. 15 but was moved to Dec.1st after the Sept.11 terrorist attacks. LSU fans were eager for a victory over Auburn after feeling disrespected during the last matchup in Tiger Stadium, when Auburn players smoked cigars on LSU's field after defeating the Bayou Bengals 41-7.

Auburn returned to Tiger Stadium in 2001 with similar behavior. During the pregame warm-ups, Auburn players stomped on LSU's midfield "Eye of the Tiger" logo, resulting in a 15-yard unsportsmanlike conduct penalty. Kicking off from the 50-yard line, LSU recovered the onside kick at the Auburn 36 and scored a touchdown six plays later.

Tensions escalated further when Auburn special teams began their post-halftime warm-ups while the LSU Marching Band was still performing its halftime routine. Kicker Damon Duval got into a squabble with two band members. Later, Tuberville sent a letter of apology to band leader Frank Wickes for Duval's behavior.

LSU ultimately prevailed 27-14 over Auburn. After the victory, LSU fans mocked Auburn by smoked cigars in the stadium. This game began a 20 year losing streak in Tiger Stadium for Auburn.

2016 - Last Second for Les 
In 2016, unranked Auburn led #18 LSU by the score of 18-13 with 2:56 left in the game. LSU drove the ball 60 yards to the Auburn 10-yard line with less than 30 seconds remaining. After 3 unsuccessful plays, LSU faced 4th down with the game clock running and only a few seconds remaining. LSU QB Danny Etling quickly approached the line of scrimmage and snapped the ball to give his team one more chance for a victory. Etling avoided a sack by running to the sideline where he threw to the back corner of the endzone to wide receiver DJ Chark for a touchdown with no time left on the clock. The referee signaled touchdown and the LSU players began to celebrate believing they had won the game. However, the referees quickly announced the previous play was under review. After further review, it was determined by the officiating staff that LSU QB Danny Etling did not snap the ball until after the game clock hit 0:00, meaning the game was over and the last play did not count. This ruling gave Auburn the 18-13 victory and LSU their 2nd loss in the first 4 games of the 2016 season. This rough start to the 2016 season along with the disappointment of the 2015 season, led to the firing of LSU head coach Les Miles the following Sunday.

2017 - LSU's Comeback
In 2017, #8 Auburn led unranked LSU 20-0 in the 2nd quarter. After a few successful drives and defensive improvements, LSU shrunk Auburn's lead to 23-14 at the start of the 4th quarter. LSU continued their comeback with a 75 yard punt return for a touchdown by D.J. Chark and 2 field goals by kicker Conner Culp to clinch the victory with a 27-23 win over Auburn. This game remains as the largest comeback in the LSU-Auburn series.

2021
Auburn and first-year head coach Bryan Harsin travelled to Death Valley to play LSU for the first SEC contest of the 2021 season and completed a comeback from being down 13-0 to win 24-19. Auburn quarterback Bo Nix, who was benched the previous week against Georgia State in favor of backup quarterback and LSU transfer T.J. Finley (who made his first SEC start at Auburn the year prior, in a 48-11 Auburn victory on Halloween night), passed for 255 yards and 1 touchdown while running for 74 yards and another touchdown en route to snapping a 10-game losing steak in Tiger Stadium and securing Auburn’s first win in Baton Rouge since Tommy Tuberville’s first season as head coach in 1999.

Future 
With Oklahoma and Texas joining the SEC no later than 2025, there is a chance Auburn and LSU will not play every year.

Game results

Miscellaneous
From 2000 to 2005, Auburn or LSU won or tied for the SEC West Division championship every season.

From 2000 to 2007, the home team won eight straight games. (Immediately before then, the road team had won four straight, from 1996 to 1999.)

The 2006 game was the lowest scoring contest between the two schools since 1935, when LSU defeated Auburn 7–3 in Auburn.

9 of the first 13 meetings were shutouts; however, neither has been shut out since.

LSU leads the series 32–24–1. LSU leads the series in games played in Baton Rouge and Montgomery, Alabama, with a 17–6–1 and 2–0 record, respectively. Auburn leads games played at Jordan–Hare Stadium (13-6), Birmingham, Alabama (3–2), and Mobile, Alabama (2–0). When the SEC expanded, Auburn and LSU were placed in the SEC's West Division. The Auburn–LSU game quickly became a highly anticipated and respected rivalry.

See also
 List of NCAA college football rivalry games

References

College football rivalries in the United States
Auburn Tigers football
LSU Tigers football